Gyau is a surname. Notable people with the surname include:

Joe Gyau (born 1992), American soccer player
Joseph Agyemang-Gyau (1939–2015), Ghanaian soccer player and traditional ruler
Phillip Gyau (born 1966), American soccer player and coach